Winwick Quay railway station served the village of Winwick, Cheshire, England, from 1831 to 1840 on the Warrington and Newton Railway.

History 
The station was opened sometime after July 1831 by the Warrington and Newton Railway, although it didn't appear in Bradshaw until August 1840. It was situated on the south side of the M62 motorway. The only nearby building it had was a small railway cottage. Due to the station's remote location, it never attracted many passengers so the decision to close it was made on 25 November 1840 and official closure occurred on 28 November 1840.

References 

Disused railway stations in Cheshire
Railway stations closed in 1840
1831 establishments in England
1840 disestablishments in England

Railway stations in Great Britain opened in 1831